Florea Opriș (born 10 March 1956) in Zimnicea, is a former Romanian rugby union football player, referee and currently coach.
He played as prop, as well as flanker.

Career
He mostly played for Farul Constanța, except in the 1990-91 season, where he moved in France, playing for Entente Sportive Avignon Saint-Saturnin.

International career
Opriș debuted for Romania against France, in Lille, on 12 April 1986. He was also part of the 1987 Rugby World Cup squad where he played only his last international match, which was also against France, in Wellington, New Zealand, on 28 May 1987.

Honours
Farul Constanța
 Cupa României: 1986-87

References

External links

1956 births
Living people
People from Zimnicea
Romanian rugby union players
Romania international rugby union players
Rugby union props